The Eureka was an American automobile manufactured only in 1900.  A product of Ough & Waltenbough of San Francisco, it was a 4408 cc rear-inclined three-cylinder with its engine under the back seat.

See also

Eureka (1907 automobile)
Eureka (French automobile)

References

David Burgess Wise, The New Illustrated Encyclopedia of Automobiles  .

Defunct motor vehicle manufacturers of the United States
Motor vehicle manufacturers based in California